Kevin Lamar Aldridge (born March 3, 1980) is a former American football defensive end who played for the Tennessee Titans of the National Football League (NFL). He also played for (NFLE) of  Barcelona Dragons and (Arena League) for Dallas Desperados and Georgia Force. He played college football at Southern Methodist University.

References 

Living people

SMU Mustangs football players
Tennessee Titans players

1980 births
American football defensive ends
Dallas Desperados players
Georgia Force players